The 1999 Over the Edge was the second annual and final Over the Edge professional wrestling pay-per-view (PPV) event produced by the World Wrestling Federation (WWF, renamed to WWE in 2002). It was held on May 23, 1999, at Kemper Arena in Kansas City, Missouri. The first Over the Edge event was held under the In Your House series in May 1998, but following the discontinuation of the In Your House shows, a second Over the Edge event was scheduled as its own PPV, thus being the first former In Your House event to do so.

In the main event, The Undertaker faced Stone Cold Steve Austin in a singles match (with Vince McMahon and Shane McMahon as the guest referees) for the WWF Championship. Of the six scheduled bouts on the undercard, two received more promotion than the others.  The first was a singles match, in which The Rock defeated Triple H by disqualification. The other was an eight-man elimination tag team match in which The Union (Mankind, Ken Shamrock, Test, and Big Show) defeated the Corporate Ministry (Viscera, Big Boss Man, and the Acolytes (Bradshaw and Faarooq)).

The event is infamous for a fatal accident involving wrestler Owen Hart, who was scheduled to face The Godfather for the WWF Intercontinental Championship during the event. Wrestling under his Blue Blazer gimmick, Hart was to make a superhero-like ring entrance, which would have seen him descend from the arena rafters into the ring. He was, however, released prematurely when the harness line malfunctioned, and fell more than  into the ring and died. Criticism later arose over Vince McMahon's decision to continue the show after Hart's accident. In court, his widow Martha, children, and parents sued the organization, contending that poor planning of the dangerous stunt caused Owen's death. WWF settled the case out of court, with the McMahon family paying  (equivalent to $M in ) to his widow, children, and parents. Due to the accident and controversy surrounding the event, the Over the Edge name was retired and its PPV slot was replaced by Judgment Day in 2000. The event was also not released for home video viewing until the launch of the WWE Network in 2014 where an edited version of the show removing any mention of Hart's death was released.

Production

Background
Over the Edge was first held as the 22nd In Your House pay-per-view (PPV) in May 1998; In Your House was a series of monthly PPV shows first produced by the World Wrestling Federation (WWF, now WWE) in May 1995. The In Your House branding was retired following February 1999's St. Valentine's Day Massacre: In Your House event, as the company moved to install permanent names for each of its monthly PPVs. The WWF then announced that Over the Edge would return on May 23, 1999, as its own PPV and would be held at Kemper Arena in Kansas City, Missouri. It was the first of the In Your House events to be held as its own separate PPV.

Storylines

The main narrative for Over the Edge continued the events that unfolded at Backlash, WWF's previous pay-per-view event, held on April 25, 1999. There, The Undertaker abducted Stephanie McMahon, the daughter of chairman Vince McMahon. The Undertaker's price for Stephanie's return was control over the wrestling organization. His plans were thwarted, however, by the WWF Champion, Steve Austin, who rescued Stephanie and denied The Undertaker his ransom. This set up a feud between the two wrestlers, which was settled in a title match at Over the Edge, in which both Vince and his son Shane, who had aligned himself with The Undertaker, would serve as the guest referee. Originally Shane had named himself the sole referee of the match, but WWF commissioner Shawn Michaels made Vince the co-referee in order to level the playing field. WWF further built up the rivalry between The Undertaker and Austin by having them attack each other on WWF programming, before their showdown. On May 3, 1999, The Undertaker threw Austin off the stage, and two weeks later, the WWF Champion handcuffed his title's challenger to a crucifix, which was raised above the ring.

Another feud culminating at Over the Edge involved Triple H and The Rock, who would meet each other in a match at the event. Triple H had interfered in one of The Rock's matches, and later threw him off the stage. leading The Rock to wearing his (kayfabe) injured arm in a plaster cast. Shane, acting as co-owner of WWF and ally of Triple H, further aggrieved The Rock by forbidding him to wear the cast for Over the Edge.

The pay-per-view event contained the rivalry among two stables, the Corporate Ministry and the Union. The Corporate Ministry was formed when the Corporation merged with the Ministry of Darkness; the Corporate Ministry consisted of Viscera, the Big Boss Man, and the Acolytes (Bradshaw and Faarooq). Throughout the month of May, the Ministry was involved in matches with Mankind, Ken Shamrock, the Big Show, and Test, and in retaliation, the four wrestlers formed the Union stable. The WWF continued to enhance the feud over several weeks, which included a brawl among all eight wrestlers on May 10, 1999. The feud led to an eight-man elimination tag team match between both groups at Over the Edge.

Other feuds included Billy Gunn against his former partner Road Dogg, the Blue Blazer against WWF Intercontinental Champion The Godfather, Mark Henry and D'Lo Brown against WWF Tag Team Champions Kane and X-Pac, Hardcore Holly against Al Snow in a Hardcore singles match for the Hardcore Title, and a mixed tag team match pitting Val Venis and Nicole Bass against Jeff Jarrett and Debra were also advertised.

Event 

Before the event began and aired live on pay-per-view, an episode of Sunday Night Heat aired live on the USA Network. Meat defeated Brian Christopher, while the Hardy Boyz (Matt Hardy and Jeff Hardy) defeated Goldust and The Blue Meanie. After the match, The Brood gave The Hardy Boyz and Hayes a bloodbath. In the final contest, Vince McMahon and Mideon fought to a no-contest, when the Corporate Ministry attacked Vince and broke his ankle (kayfabe) in order to prevent him from refereeing the main event match.

Jim Ross and Jerry "The King" Lawler were the English commentators for the event, while Carlos Cabrera and Hugo Savinovich were the Spanish commentators. Howard Finkel acted as the ring announcer. The referees included Tim White, Mike Chioda, and Teddy Long. Other officials include Vince McMahon, Pat Patterson, and Gerald Brisco.

Preliminary matches 
After Sunday Night Heat, the pay-per-view began with a tag team match, in which the WWF Tag Team Champions Kane and X-Pac defended against Mark Henry and D'Lo Brown. During the match, Henry lifted X-Pac and rammed his back against the steel ring post at ringside. Afterward, Brown and Henry simultaneously attacked X-Pac, which led Kane to launch himself from the top turnbuckle onto Brown and Henry. After the competitors reentered the ring, Kane performed a chokeslam on Henry, lifting him by the throat and slamming him down. Kane then pinned Henry to retain the WWF Tag Team Title. Next was the hardcore match, which allowed no disqualifications or countouts. WWF Hardcore Champion Al Snow defended against Hardcore Holly. Holly and Snow began their match in the ring but moved their brawl into the arena stands. From there, they proceeded to the backstage area, and into the concession stands before returning to the ring. The fight was decided when Snow lifted Holly onto his shoulders and threw him through a wooden table. Successfully covering and pinning Holly, Snow retained the WWF Hardcore Title.

The next scheduled match was a singles match for the WWF Intercontinental Title between The Godfather (champion) and the Blue Blazer. As Hart descended into the ring on a safety harness, the equipment gave way, and he fell. Emergency medical technicians (EMTs) rushed him to the hospital, but he was pronounced dead on arrival. The show was halted for 15 minutes before it continued with the next match, a mixed tag team match pitting Val Venis and Nicole Bass against Jeff Jarrett and Debra. At one point, Jarrett attempted to hit Bass with a guitar, but Venis took the guitar away, dropped Jarrett on the mat and pinned him. In the fourth match of the evening, Billy Gunn defeated his former tag team partner Road Dogg, after hitting him with the time keeper's hammer.

Main event matches 

The fifth match was the eight-man elimination tag-team match between The Union and the Corporate Ministry. Test was eliminated by pinfall after Bradshaw performed a  "Clothesline from Hell" on him. Bradshaw was then eliminated by submission as a result of Ken Shamrock's ankle lock. Afterwards, Shamrock was eliminated via disqualification as a result of attacking the referee. Then, Faarooq was eliminated by pinfall after the Big Show chokeslammed him. Only one member of each team remained after Viscera and the Big Show failed to return to the ring within ten seconds and were counted out as a result. The Union won the match after Mankind forced Boss Man to submit with the Mandible claw. It was at this point that the viewers at home were told by Jim Ross that Owen Hart had died.

The final match on the undercard pitted Triple H against The Rock. Triple H targeted The Rock's injured arm. Towards the end of the match, Triple H asked Chyna, his valet, to retrieve a folding chair. The referee, however, took it away from him, which led to an argument between Triple H and the referee; Triple H pushed down the referee, for which he was disqualified, giving The Rock the victory. After the match, Mankind ran in to save The Rock from Triple H and Chyna.

In the main event, Stone Cold Steve Austin defended his WWF Championship against the Undertaker. Originally, Shane and Vince McMahon were supposed to be the guest referees, Vince McMahon had his ankle (kayfabe) broken earlier in the event and was replaced by his accomplice Pat Patterson, to prevent Shane from helping The Undertaker. Patterson, however, could not continue after the Undertaker chokeslammed him. The Undertaker and Austin wrestled inconclusively until Austin hit The Undertaker on the head with a folding chair. As Austin went to cover the Undertaker, Gerald Brisco, another accomplice of Vince, came down to the ring to replace Patterson and counted the unsuccessful pinfall attempt by Austin. Like his partner Patterson, Brisco was attacked by the Undertaker. Vince then came down to the ring to act as referee, but when Austin forcefully executed a stunner on the Undertaker, Shane prevented Vince from performing a three count. As Vince, Shane and Austin, argued, Shane shoved Vince into Austin, who fell into a roll-up by The Undertaker. Shane performed a fast count to give Undertaker the victory and the WWF Championship.

Owen Hart accident 

When Owen Hart was to challenge The Godfather for the WWF Intercontinental Championship, he was performing as the Blue Blazer. The character, originally used by Hart in the late 1980s, had recently been revived as a superhero gimmick that parodied various wrestlers. At Over the Edge, Hart was to emulate WCW wrestler Sting's ring entrance by descending from the arena rafters in a suspended harness, stopping a few feet above the floor, at which point the suspension mechanism would "malfunction" and drop him unceremoniously onto the ring. As he fell, he landed chest-first on the top rope.

The accident was not seen by television viewers. A pre-recorded interview video was shown at the start of Hart's descent, and when the broadcast returned live, the cameras quickly turned away from the ring to the audience. Soon afterward, Jim Ross, one of the commentators of the event, informed pay-per-view viewers that Hart had fallen from the rafters, that the incident was "not a part of the entertainment" and that it was "a real situation". Ross's broadcast partner Jerry Lawler immediately ran to the ring to check on Hart and was visibly shaken when he returned to the announcer table on air, saying somberly  "it doesn't look good at all." EMTs came down to the ring and gave Hart CPR, but he showed no response to the treatment. Bringing Hart out on a gurney, the EMTs boarded the heavily injured wrestler into an ambulance and took him to nearby Truman Medical Center in Kansas City.

At 7:59 Central Standard Time, Hart arrived at Truman Medical Center. At this point, he was not technically dead considering his Glasgow Coma Scale, a system used to measure neurological function was listed at a 3/15. 3 is the lowest possible score meaning eye, verbal and motor function each received a score of 1, thus totalling 3. A "GCS of 3" in medical speak refers to imminent death or that death has already occurred. The initial reading from the cardiac monitor indicated he was asystole, meaning that he had no detectable heart activity at all. However, mere seconds later, there were signs of pulseless electrical activity, meaning his heart was not beating but faint electrical activity was still detectable. At this point, nurses began calling out observations to the doctor on the apparent lifeless body of Hart to doctor Michael Tucker. Hart’s skin had turned blue, his lips were colorless and his skin was cold, nurses also reported he had no bowel sounds and his abdomen was soft. Nurses also noted that he had also suffered an apparent open fracture above his left elbow and a cut below, but these wounds were of little concern to the medical staff at the moment. Nonetheless, the medical staff still persisted on and pumped Hart’s unresponsive body with epinephrine in an attempt to stimulate his heart. Still, no pulse was detected, even though his heart still showed signs of slight electrical activity. Outside in the waiting room, former wrestler Harley Race paced anxiously, awaiting word on Hart. He would later be joined by Jeff Jarrett, who participated earlier that night in the event. By the end of the night, a variety of concerned wrestlers who numbered close to two dozen had arrived to get information on Hart's condition. At 8:07 a final dose of epinephrine and atropine went into Hart’s right femoral line. After four minutes, he was still unresponsive. CPR was performed in the final few minutes of his life but the doctors determined that all resuscitation efforts were futile. 13 minutes after arriving at the medical center, 33 minutes after the fall, all work on Hart was stopped. At 8:12 P.M. Hart was pronounced dead at the age of 34.

After the incident, the event was halted for 15 minutes, until Vince McMahon and other WWF Corporate officials decided to continue the event. Hart's coworkers, professional wrestlers, and other miscellaneous workers appeared somber after Hart's fall as they continued to do their jobs. An hour after the event restarted, Ross informed pay-per-view viewers that Hart had died at the age of 34 at a nearby hospital. The fans in attendance were not told any information about what had happened to Hart, and they did not hear the announcement of his death.

 Ross was informed by WWE Television producer Kevin Dunn of Hart's death via headset and that Ross had ten seconds to get back on the air.

Aftermath 
After the event, in response to Owen Hart's death, the WWF canceled the encore presentation of Over the Edge via pay-per-view, and they also canceled four live events in Canada and one in Illinois. The 1999 Over the Edge event was never officially released on VHS or DVD due to Hart's death. The event was in turn discontinued and its PPV slot was replaced by Judgment Day in 2000. In 2014, the event was shown in an edited form on WWE's online streaming service, the WWE Network. All mentions of the Blue Blazer character were also removed from the Sunday Night Heat pre-show when the episodes of the show were added to the WWE Network in 2018, while the Blue Blazer gimmick was also removed from the video game WWF Attitude, which also features a tribute to him on the game's startup. On May 24, 1999, the day following this event, tributes to Hart were held on Raw is War (which was held in St. Louis) and on WCW Monday Nitro (which was held in Greenville, South Carolina); the WWF tribute was called Raw is Owen. For the WWF tribute show, all storylines and rivalries were stopped, and wrestlers were given the option to wrestle or not. The show also included interviews and testimonies from his coworkers and highlights of his professional wrestling career.

Owen Hart's funeral service was held on May 31, 1999, in Calgary, Alberta, Canada, and it was attended by family members, friends, and over 300 wrestlers who were acquainted with him. Following the funeral, Hart was buried in Calgary's Queens Park Cemetery later that day. Three weeks after the event, his widow, children, and parents sued the WWF for causing Owen's death with a poorly planned stunt; they claimed that the harness system was defective. After the court case had extended one-and-a-half years, a settlement was reached on November 2, 2000, when the WWF agreed to pay his widow, children, and parents US$18 million. The manufacturer of the harness system had also been named as a defendant in the case but was dismissed from the case after the settlement was reached.

After Over the Edge, The Rock began a feud with The Undertaker over the WWF Championship, culminating in a match at King of the Ring, after The Rock defeated The Undertaker and Triple H in a Triple Threat Match, to earn a WWF Championship match against the Undertaker. At King of the Ring, the Undertaker defeated The Rock to retain his title. Steve Austin engaged in a rivalry with Vince and Shane McMahon in retaliation for their interference during his match at Over the Edge. Austin lost the match at King of the Ring, and his (kayfabe) 50% control in the WWF, but before that he scheduled himself in a title match against the Undertaker on June 28. Austin won the match and the title. Eventually, a feud developed between Austin, Mankind, and Triple H over the WWF title, which led to a match at SummerSlam. There, Mankind won the WWF title. Owen Hart (as his "Blue Blazer" alter-ego) had been booked to win the Intercontinental Title from The Godfather at Over the Edge. Hart's tag team partner and good friend Jeff Jarrett won the title a week later on Raw, using Debra's Women's Championship belt to defeat The Godfather. Jarrett shouted "Owen Hart!" upon being handed the Intercontinental Championship belt.

Reactions 
Vince McMahon and the World Wrestling Federation received strong criticism for designing the stunt and allowing the event to continue after Owen Hart's fall. In his weekly column for the Calgary Sun—a major newspaper in Hart's hometown—on May 31, 1999, Bret Hart (who at the time had a very acrimonious relationship with the company due to the Montreal Screwjob a year and a half prior) blamed Vince McMahon for his brother's death. He "question[ed] if this was really necessary" and said, "Shame on you, Vince McMahon." He also claimed that the tribute show "reeked of disrespect," stating, "Yes, the so-called tribute where afterward wrestlers point to their crotches and say: 'Suck it!' It makes me nauseous." Bret Hart would later state that he wished he would've been in the WWF at the time, so he could've talked his brother out of doing the stunt. 

Other members of the Hart family also blamed Vince McMahon for Owen's death, claiming that the accident was the inevitable outcome of "an obsession for ratings and revenues." While in Calgary for Owen's funeral, wrestler Hulk Hogan stated, "Hopefully something good will happen. Wrestling's gotten … way too over the top". In reference to McMahon, he added, "I hope he learns a lesson from this horrible accident". Ralph Klein, the incumbent Premier of Alberta at the time, expressed a hope that Hart's death would lead to changes in wrestling, stating, "Maybe the various federations will rethink the gimmickry."

Calgary Sun columnist Eric Francis called McMahon's decision to continue the event "sick, disrespectful and wrong. But what else would you expect from the WWF?" He added, "if there's any justice in this world, McMahon will pay dearly for what his organization has done to further pain the Harts". Some fans were also upset with the decision to carry on with the show. One man, who left the event with his children upon hearing that Hart had died, claimed, "It was disgusting. … For kids to see that, for this to be so-called family entertainment, for them to just carry on as if nothing had happened, is just sad." Martha Hart, Owen's wife, refused to criticize McMahon publicly in the immediate aftermath of her husband's death. She said that McMahon "absolutely should be there" at the funeral. She also stated, "I'm a very forgiving person and I'm not bitter or angry, but there will be a day of reckoning". Commenting on the WWF's decision to continue the show after her husband's death, Martha stated, "After he lost his fight for life they just scooped him up and ordered the next match out. Where's the humanity? Would he have wanted the show to go on? Absolutely not."

The WWF received some support from people who felt that the company did the right thing by continuing the event. Vince Russo, a WWF scriptwriter at the time, pointed to the fact that Brian Pillman, a family friend of the Harts and a member of The Hart Foundation, died shortly before the Badd Blood: In Your House pay-per-view on which he was scheduled to perform in 1997. After learning of Pillman's death, both Bret and Owen Hart went ahead with their matches on the show. Russo claimed that this showed that "the night he passed away I'm sure Owen would have wanted the same thing." Vince McMahon refused to comment on Hart's death until he felt sufficient time had passed. When asked if he felt responsible for the accident, he replied, "I have a lot to say and I will say it. I promise you that. But this is not the time to do it. … Give me a few days. Give me to the end of the week. Then we'll talk." The day after Over the Edge, the WWF published a message in the Calgary Sun, stating, "We do not have much information as to how it happened and will not know until an investigation is completed. We are all shaken, and to say Owen will be missed is to fall short of a way to fully explain what he meant to us." Although the WWF had no information, they reported that "Our thoughts and prayers go out to the entire Hart family. We have to be strong for Owen; he was an extraordinary human being and consummate performer and knows that the highest tribute that we can pay is to go on entertaining the fans he loved so much."

Reception
In 2013, Dylan Diot of 411Mania gave the event a rating of 4.5 [Poor], stating, "It's hard to review this event considering the circumstances involving the death of Owen Hart. The matches on this show weren't that good and the show looked like it wasn't going to be that good even before the Owen incident occurred. However, I can't fault the performance of anyone that had to follow Owen's accident as it is completely understandable that the guys did not have their hearts in the matches following the incident."

Results

References 

1999 in Missouri
Professional wrestling controversies
1999
Events in Missouri
Events in Kansas City, Missouri
Professional wrestling in Kansas City, Missouri
1999 WWF pay-per-view events
May 1999 events in the United States